Murder is the unlawful killing of a human being by another.

Murder may also refer to:

Art, entertainment, and media

Films 
 Murder!, 1930 British International Pictures release, directed by Alfred Hitchcock
 Murder (film series), three Indian films, produced by Mukesh Bhatt, emphasizing adult themes combined with violence
 Murder (2004 film), first installment, in 2004, of Bollywood film series, Murder
 Murder 2, second installment, in 2011, of Bollywood film series, Murder
 Murder 3, third installment, in 2013, of Bollywood film series, Murder
 Murder (2020 film), a Telugu-language crime thriller film
 An Act of Murder (1948), crime film directed by Michael Gordon

Gaming
 Murder (game), a parlour game
 Murder! (video game), 1990 video game published by U.S. Gold
 Murder, computer game published by Rabbit Software
 Murder, popular game mode, made for sandbox physics game Garry's Mod

Music 
 Murder (album), an album by Gehenna
 The Murder (Boondox album), an album by Boondox
 Murder, the third disc in the three-disc Johnny Cash compilation Love, God, Murder
 "The Murder", music score composed by Bernard Herrmann for the 1960 film Psycho

Songs
 "Murder" (song), by New Order
 "Murder", by Ashlee Simpson on the album Bittersweet World
 "Murder", by Coldplay on the single "God Put a Smile upon Your Face"
 "Murder", by Thara Prashad featuring Jay Sean, included in the album My Own Way
 "Murder", by The Crystal Method on the album Tweekend
 "Murder", by Bad Religion on the album New Maps of Hell
 "Murder", by David Gilmour on the album About Face
 "Murder", by Helmet on the album Strap It On
 "Murder", by Susumu Hirasawa from Sword-Wind Chronicle BERSERK Original Soundtrack
 "Murder", by Horse the Band on the album A Natural Death
 "Murder", by Katatonia on the album Brave Murder Day
 "Murder", by Royce da 5'9" on the album Street Hop
 "Murder", by The Pogues on the album Hell's Ditch
 "Murder", by Powerman 5000 on the album Destroy What You Enjoy
 "Murder", by Sepultura on the album Arise
 "Murder", by UGK on the album Ridin' Dirty
 "Murder", by Jack Green on the album Humanesque
 "Murder", by Justin Timberlake on the album The 20/20 Experience (2 of 2)
 "Murder", by Spice on the mixtape Captured

Television
 Murder (UK TV series), a 2012 and 2016 British crime series broadcast by BBC Two
 Murder (U.S. TV program), a 2007 American reality competition television program that aired on Spike
 Murder (miniseries), a British four 60-minute installment miniseries broadcast by BBC in May 2002; directed by Beeban Kidron
 "Murder" (The Office), 2009 episode of American comedy TV series

Other uses
Murder, the collective noun for a group of crows

See also
 Murder, Inc. (disambiguation)
 Murder One (disambiguation)
 Murderer (disambiguation)
 Act of Murder (disambiguation)
 Murda (disambiguation)